Leopardus is a genus comprising eight species of small cats native to the Americas. This genus is considered the oldest branch of a genetic lineage of small cats in the Americas whose common ancestor crossed the Bering land bridge from Asia to North America in the late Miocene.

Characteristics 
Leopardus species have spotted fur, with ground colors ranging from pale buff, ochre,  fulvous and tawny to light gray. Their small ears are rounded and white-spotted; their rhinarium is prominent and naked above, and their nostrils are widely separated. They have 36 chromosomes, whereas other felids have 38.

Taxonomy 
The generic name Leopardus was proposed by John Edward Gray in 1842, when he described two spotted cat skins from Central America and two from India in the collection of the Natural History Museum, London.
Several genera were proposed in the 19th and early 20th centuries for small spotted cats in the Americas, including:
Dendrailurus, Lynchailurus, Noctifelis, Oncifelis and Oncoïdes by Nikolai Severtzov in 1858;
Margay, Pajeros, Pardalina and Pardalis by Gray in 1867;
Oncilla by Joel Asaph Allen in 1919;
Oreailurus by Ángel Cabrera in 1940;
Colocolo by Reginald Innes Pocock in 1941.
Analysis of skull morphology of these taxa revealed close similarities in their base of skulls and nasal bones, their masticatory muscles, and dentition.
Phylogenetic analysis of tissue samples of these taxa and their ability to hybridise support the notion that they are members of the same genus.
The following living Leopardus species are recognized as valid taxa since 2017:

Analysis of 142 Pampas cat museum specimen collected across South America showed significant morphological differences between them. Therefore, it was proposed to split the Pampas cat and oncilla species complexes, and recognize the following as distinct species: the Pantanal cat (L. braccatus), eastern oncilla (L. emiliae), northern colocolo (L. garleppi), Muñoa's colocolo (L. munoai) and southern colocolo (L. pajeros). This classification has yet to be accepted by other taxonomists.

Phylogeny 

The last common ancestor of Leopardus, Puma and Lynx is estimated to have lived , based on analysis of nuclear DNA of cat species. Analysis of their mitochondrial DNA indicates that their last common ancestor lived . It crossed the Isthmus of Panama probably during the Great American Biotic Interchange in the late Pliocene.
Leopardus vorohuensis is an extinct species of the genus, of which fossils were found in the Argentinian Vorohué Formation dated to the early Pleistocene; its supraorbital foramen and shape of teeth resemble those of the pampas cat.

Within the genus, three distinct clades were identified: one comprising the ocelot and the margay, a second the Andean mountain cat and Pampas cat, and the third the kodkod, oncilla and Geoffroy's cat. The following cladogram shows estimated divergence times in million years ago (mya).

References

External links 

 
Mammal genera
Extant Pleistocene first appearances
Mammals of Central America
Mammals of South America
Mammals of North America
Mammals described in 1842
Taxa named by John Edward Gray
Felines